Zimogorye is the name of several rural localities in Russia:
Zimogorye, Moscow Oblast, a village under the administrative jurisdiction of Zelenogradsky Suburban Settlement in Pushkinsky District of Moscow Oblast;  
Zimogorye, Novgorod Oblast, a selo under the administrative jurisdiction of the town of district significance of Valday in Valdaysky District of Novgorod Oblast;

References